Benjamin Franklin duPont is an American businessman known for founding the company yet2.com and yet2Ventures. He is a member of the prominent Du Pont family. He co-founded and is a partner at Chartline Capital Partners.

Career
In 1986 duPont began working for the DuPont corporation, a company the du Ponts founded in 1802. He held various management positions in the company over 13 years. In 1999, he left DuPont to cofound yet2.com with Phillip Stern, a U.S. patent distribution firm located in Cambridge, Massachusetts. DuPont serves as the company's president. After a year of development the firm had raised $24 million in financing and was described as a "quasi-clearinghouse for technology developed by corporations" by Forbes Magazine, where both inventors and companies can post their patents for sale or lease to other firms.

In December 2002, yet2.com was acquired by Scipher, but the next year duPont reacquired it from Scipher and became its executive director. The website had grown into the world's largest open innovation platform. A venture capital firm, yet2Ventures, remained independent after being incubated at yet2.com. yet2Ventures has specialized in investments in medical devices, electronics, materials science, clean tech, and other technology. The company has offices in Liverpool, Boston, Tokyo, and Wilmington, Delaware. In 2010, yet2Ventures completed a transaction with the Japan Asia Investment Corporation relating to its U.S. venture portfolio. Over the years his firm has invested in more than 40 U.S. companies. and a number of secondary direct and primary transactions.

DuPont has served as a director of Vianix, Speakman, Longwood Gardens Inc., Gigsky, Inc, and Bessemer Trust Delaware. Since 2008 he has been a member of the board of the directors for MSCI. He is also chairman of the board for Mobeam Inc., headquartered in California's Silicon Valley. and a board observer of Ecrio. In 2015, he co-founded Zip Code Wilmington, a nationally recognized nonprofit coding boot camp in Wilmington.

In April 2018 duPont and business partner Don Wirth announced plans to purchase the DuPont Country Club (constructed 1921 in Wilmington) from DowDuPont. DuPont and Wirth plan to modernize the club.

Family
Benjamin Franklin duPont was born in 1964. His father was Pierre S. du Pont IV, Republican U.S. Representative and Governor of Delaware from 1977 to 1985. He graduated from Tufts University with a Bachelor of Science in mechanical engineering in 1986. In August 2001, Ben married Laura Leigh Lemole, a jewelry designer, at her parents' summer home in Cumberland, Maine. They have two children. DuPont's brother-in-law, G. Michael Lemole Jr., is a neurosurgeon who operated on Arizona congresswoman Gabby Giffords after she was shot in the head in 2011. His sister-in-law is Lisa Lemole Oz, wife of Mehmet Oz. DuPont's niece is Daphne Oz.

References

External links
 

American technology chief executives
1964 births
Ben duPont
Living people
Tufts University School of Engineering alumni
20th-century American businesspeople
21st-century American businesspeople